Reuben Yem (born 29 October 1997) is a Nigerian professional footballer who currently plays for Slovak Fortuna Liga club AS Trenčín as a defender.

Club career

AS Trenčín
Yem made his Fortuna Liga debut for AS Trenčín against iClinic Sereď on 5 August 2018. He featured in the starting-XI and completed the entirety of the 5:1 win.

References

External links
 AS Trenčín official club profile. 
 
 Futbalnet profile 
 
 Ligy.sk profile 

1997 births
Living people
Place of birth missing (living people)
Nigerian footballers
Nigerian expatriate footballers
Association football defenders
FK Inter Bratislava players
AS Trenčín players
K.A.A. Gent players
Slovak Super Liga players
2. Liga (Slovakia) players
Nigerian expatriate sportspeople in Slovakia
Nigerian expatriate sportspeople in Belgium
Expatriate footballers in Slovakia
Expatriate footballers in Belgium